Who's The Boss or Who's the Boss may refer to:

Who's the Boss?, an American sitcom series 
Who's the Boss? (album), 1989 album by Antoinette
Who's the Boss (album), 2006 album by St. Lunatics
Who's the Boss? (2013 film), a Dominican Republic Spanish-language comedy film
Who's the Boss (2020 film), a Nigerian English-language romantic comedy film

See also 
Who's Boss?, a 1914 silent film